Hemidactylus bouvieri, also known commonly as Bouvier's leaf-toed gecko and the Cape Verde leaf-toed gecko, is a species of lizard in the family Gekkonidae. The species is endemic to the Cape Verde Islands and is listed as critically endangered. There are two recognized subspecies.

Geographic range
In the Cape Verde Islands H. bouvieri has been found on the islands of São Vicente, Santo Antão, Santa Luzia, São Nicolau, Santiago and Ilhéu Raso.

Taxonomy and etymology
H. bouvieri was originally described and named by Marie Firmin Bocourt in 1870. The specific name, bouvieri, is in honor of French zoologist Aimé Bouvier (died 1919).

Habitat

Reproduction
H. bouvieri is oviparous.

Subspecies
There are two subspecies which are considered to be valid, including the nominotypical subspecies.
Hemidactylus bouvieri bouvieri 
Hemidactylus bouvieri razoensis 

The former subspecies, Hemidactylus bouvieri boavistensis , is considered a separate species, Hemidactylus boavistensis.

Nota bene: A trinomial authority in parentheses indicates that the subspecies was originally described in a genus other than Hemidactylus.

References

Further reading
Bocourt MF (1870). "Description de quelques sauriens nouveaux originaires de l'Amérique méridionale [= Description of Some New Lizards Originating in Central America]". Nouvelles Archives du Muséum d'Histoire Naturelle de Paris [= New Archives of the Natural History Museum of Paris] 6: 11–18. (Emydactylus bouvieri, new species, pp. 17–18). (in French).
Boulenger GA (1906). "Report on the reptiles collected by the late L. Fea in West Africa". Annali del Museo Civico di Storia Naturale di Genova [= Annals of the Civic Museum of Natural History of Genoa], Series 3, 42: 196–216. (Hemidactylus boavistensis, new species, p. 198).
Gruber HJ, Schleich HH (1982). "Hemidactylus bouvieri razoensis nov. ssp. von den Kapverdischen] [= Hemidactylus bouvieri razoensis, new subspecies, from the Cape Verde Islands". Spixiana 5 (3): 303–310. (in German).

bouvieri
Endemic vertebrates of Cape Verde
Fauna of São Vicente, Cape Verde
Reptiles described in 1870
Taxa named by Marie Firmin Bocourt